Turner is a small lunar impact crater that lies in the Mare Insularum, near the Moon's equator. The crater was named after British astronomer Herbert Hall Turner. It is located to the southeast of the crater Gambart. Turner is a circular, cone-shaped crater with inner walls that slope down to the midpoint. A similar-sized ghost crater is attached to the western rim, its interior floor submerged by lava and the surviving rim broken in the southwest.

Satellite craters
By convention these features are identified on lunar maps by placing the letter on the side of the crater midpoint that is closest to Turner.

References

External links

Turner at The Moon Wiki

Impact craters on the Moon